Chen Weixing (Simplified Chinese: 陈卫星 Hanyu Pinyin: Chén Wèixīng, born April 27, 1972, Inner Mongolia, China) is an Austrian table tennis player of Chinese origin. He has played for SVS Lower Austria for several years.

Chen found it difficult to be selected in China's competitive national team. He made it to the top 15 but the opportunity to play at world class level was limited. Therefore, he decided to venture to Europe, first to Hungary, then Germany then Austria. Chen is considered to be one of the best defensive players in the world, reaching his personal best ranking of World number 9 in 2006.

Since the opening in 2011 Chen Weixing practices at the Werner Schlager Academy in Schwechat, Austria where he also works as a coach since 2015.

Success
 Winner of the European Champions League: 2007/2008
 Double European Champion 2002
 Vice European Cup 2005
 ETTU-European Cup in 2000, won the TTG Hoengen

See also
 List of table tennis players

References

External links
 
 
 
 
 

1972 births
Living people
Austrian male table tennis players
Table tennis players at the 2004 Summer Olympics
Table tennis players at the 2008 Summer Olympics
Table tennis players at the 2012 Summer Olympics
Olympic table tennis players of Austria
Chinese emigrants to Austria
Table tennis players from Inner Mongolia
People from Baotou
Naturalised table tennis players
Naturalised citizens of Austria
Austrian sportspeople of Chinese descent